Kushiel's Dart is a fantasy novel by American writer Jacqueline Carey, the first book in her Kushiel's Legacy series. The idea for the book first came to Carey when she was reading the Biblical Book of Genesis, specifically a passage about "Sons of God" coming into the "Daughters of Men". Later, when she was writing a coffee table book, she encountered Jewish folklore, which paralleled the story in greater detail. The fictional nation of Terre D'Ange in the story was founded by a rebel angel.

The World of Terre D'Ange

Setting
The Kushiel's Legacy series is set in a medieval world modeled after Earth (the map at the beginning of the novels is a map of Earth, with creatively historically named countries). The main characters are from Terre d'Ange, which occupies the area of France.

Terre d'Ange was founded by Elua and His Companions and is thereby a nation of progeny of fallen angels.

Each of Elua's companions founded a  province of Terre d'Ange, except Cassiel, who chose to remain loyal to the commandments of the One God and not 'commingle with mortals'.

Society

Elua's precept was "Love as thou wilt". This results in the fact that love and physical pleasure is a central aspect of society in Terre d'Ange. Although marriage exists in Terre d'Ange, it is viewed equally with other forms of love, including dalliance, taking a lover or consort, etc. It likewise engendered an acceptance of any form of love, be it reverent or harsh, heterosexual, homosexual, or bisexual. Usually, as part of a marriage, a D'Angeline lights a candle to Eisheth, asking her to "open the womb" of the woman so that she may be able to become pregnant.

One of the central institutions of Terre d'Ange is service to the angel Naamah. As such, her adepts are courtesans who prostitute themselves in a sacred service that honours Naamah's similar sacrifice to Elua. Naamah was said to have 'la[in] down with strangers in the marketplace for coin' in order that Elua could eat when the Companions had no money. She also, according to legend, offered herself to the King of Persis in exchange for Elua's freedom. In Naamah's honour, Servants of Naamah provide sexual services to paying clients (which goes to the owner of their marque, or into the pockets of the courtesans who have earned their marques) and an optional 'patron gift' freely offered in honour of Naamah (which pays for the marque to be tattooed onto the courtesans' backs).

The Court of Night-Blooming Flowers, or the "Night Court," is in the City of Elua and comprises Thirteen Houses. Each house has a head, called the Dowayne. Each Servant of Naamah owes a debt to their House for the training they have received, and in many cases upbringing. Their debt is considered complete when their marque, a tattoo covering the entire back, is complete.

Ruling classes
Terre D'Ange exists in a monarchical system, which is currently ruled by the Courcel line. They are directly descended from Elua, and their signature physical attribute is a graceful neck, which parallels the fact that their emblem is the Swan.

Each region has its own ruling elite in a feudal structure.

The courts are separate from the feudal ruling class and function in a similar fashion to present-day European courts including various levels of appellate courts. Final appeals can be brought to the King/Queen, who will either hear a case or rule that the previous judgements were appropriate and thereby refuse to hear the appeal. D'Angelines are known to treat their criminals and prisoners in a fashion similar to that of present-day European standards, though capital punishment and public floggings are practised. Rape is a capital offense.

Plot summary
The book follows Phèdre nó Delaunay's life from birth. She's born with a mote in her eye, which makes her appear inappropriate for service as a religious courtesan, but it is revealed that this is actually a sign that she is an 'anguissette' or sexual masochist, deriving sexual pleasure from pain. Her bond is purchased by a nobleman who does train her as a courtesan, and discovers a plot against her homeland which she has a chance to interrupt.

Characters

Delaunay's household
 Phèdre nó Delaunay – Main protagonist
 Anafiel Delaunay – Noble, Phèdre and Alcuin's mentor
 Alcuin nó Delaunay – foster brother to Phèdre
 Joscelin Verreuil – a Cassiline Brother
Guy – an expelled Cassiline Brother

Royal Family of Terre D'Ange
Ganelon de la Courcel – King of Terre d'Ange
Rolande de la Courcel – son of Ganelon de la Courcel, Dauphin
Isabel L'Envers – wife of Rolande; Princess-Consort
Ysandre de la Courcel – daughter of Rolande and Isabel, Dauphine

Companions of Elua
Elua – "The Misbegotten" was conceived from the comingling of the Yeshua's blood from the Tiberium spear that killed Yeshua on the cross, with the tears of the Magdalene who loved him, and born from the womb of Mother Earth.
Naamah – an angel. She is 'Venus'and patron of courtesans, and sanctified all sex as holy as long as it is consensual and motivated by some form of love.
Anael – an angel
Cassiel – an angel. His form of love centers around abstainment, protection, and self-sacrifice. Cassiel alone has no descendants but his followers are celibate priests/bodyguards.
Shemhazai – an angel
Azza – an angel
Kushiel – an angel.  His form of love centers around punishment, expiation of guilt, and overcoming pain. Descendants of Kushiel are Sadists.
Eisheth – an angel
Camael – an angel.

Others
Master of the Straits, – Controls the seas between Alba and Terre D'Ange
Hyacinthe, son of Anasztaizia – a Tsingano, "The Prince of Travellers."
Drustan mab Necthana – son of Necthana; Prince of the Picti
Waldemar Selig – Skaldi warlord
 Melisande, a seductive but sinister noblewoman whom Phedre finds irresistible.

Awards and nominations
Kushiel's Dart won the 2002 Locus Award for Best First Novel. It was also nominated for the 2002 Gaylactic Spectrum Awards.

References

External links
 

2001 fantasy novels
Debut fantasy novels
Tor Books books
Novels with bisexual themes
2001 debut novels
Novels about prostitution